The 2019 Cheez-It Bowl was a college football bowl game played on December 27, 2019, with kickoff at 10:15 p.m. EST (8:15 p.m. local MST) on ESPN. It was the 31st edition of the game originally staged as the Copper Bowl, the second edition played under the sponsorship of Cheez-It, and one of the 2019–20 bowl games concluding the 2019 FBS football season.

Teams
The game matched the Air Force Falcons from the Mountain West Conference (MWC) and the Washington State Cougars from the Pac-12 Conference. This was the first meeting between the two programs.

Air Force Falcons

Air Force entered the game ranked 24th in the AP Poll, with a 10–2 record (7–1 in conference) and a seven-game winning streak. The Falcons finished in second place in the Mountain Division of Mountain West. This was Air Force's second Cheez-It Bowl; their 1995 team appeared in the then-Copper Bowl, losing to Texas Tech, 55–41.

Washington State Cougars

Washington State entered the game at 6–6 (3–6 in conference). The Cougars tied for fifth place in the Pac-12's North Division. This was Washington State's second Cheez-It Bowl; their 1992 team won the then-Copper Bowl over Utah, 31–28.

Game summary

Statistics

See also
 2020 Cheez-It Bowl, the next so-named bowl game, played at Camping World Stadium in Orlando, Florida

References

External links
 Game statistics at statbroadcast.com

Cheez-It Bowl
Guaranteed Rate Bowl
Air Force Falcons football bowl games
Washington State Cougars football bowl games
Cheez-It Bowl
Cheez-It Bowl
2010s in Phoenix, Arizona